Crowninshield Island, also known as Brown's Island, is a small island off the shore of Marblehead, Massachusetts.  Since 1955, it has been maintained by The Trustees of Reservations. For all Trustees of Reservations purposes, the island is referred to as Crowninshield Island, however federally the island is still maintained as "Brown's Island", and it remains better known by that name locally.

Original Owner
The island had been owned by the Brown family from 1797-1918. The Massachusetts Trustees of Reservations describe themselves as "the oldest statewide land conservation organization in the country." In honor of Louise E. du Pont Crowninshield, a historic preservationist who married Francis Boardman Crowninshield, a member of the noted Crowninshield family, they suggested to call it Crowninshield Island, honoring the pioneer in America's historic preservation movement from 1925 until her death in 1958. Crowninshield summered at Peach's Point and the family donated the island to the Trustees in 1955. The Crowninshields purchased the island from the Browns for $1 in 1918. The Crowninshields were Boston Brahmins who had been historically powerful in nearby Salem, the original town from which Marblehead was formed.

Proposed Name Change
Early January 2009, Gene Record wrote to selectmen of Marblehead asking to change the name of the island. While the Trustees list it as Crowninshield Island they never had the name officially changed by the U.S. Board on Geographic Names, a federal office maintained by the U.S. Geological Survey. In addition, the Board on Geographic Names doesn't approve a request for a name change unless it comes from the local government.

In his letter, Mr. Record, a relative of the Crowninshields, mentioned their generous support of Marblehead institutions and asked the selectmen to send in their support. The selectmen voted unanimously to oppose the name change.

Physical Features
Marking the entrance to Dolliber Cove and Marblehead Little Harbor,  Crowninshield Island features a rocky shore, sandy beach, meadow, and salt marsh.  There is some anecdotal evidence that it has at times been considered two separate islands, a notion which the topography of the whole would seem to support.  Accessible by foot via mudflats during low tide, it is most frequently used as a spot for picnicking and sightseeing, with Grace Oliver Beach, Fort Sewall, Gerry Island, Marblehead Light, and Marblehead Harbor all located in the vicinity.

See also
 List of islands in Massachusetts

References

External links
 Crowninshield Island The Trustees of Reservations
 Massachusetts Coast Guide: Marblehead map
 Massachusetts Coast Guide: Marblehead site descriptions

The Trustees of Reservations
Crowninshield family
Islands of Essex County, Massachusetts
Coastal islands of Massachusetts
Marblehead, Massachusetts
Open space reserves of Massachusetts
Protected areas of Essex County, Massachusetts
1955 establishments in Massachusetts
Protected areas established in 1955